Yiasoumis Yiasoumi or Yiasemakis Yiasemi (born 31 May 1975) is a retired Cypriot footballer who last played for AEK Larnaca. He was also a player of Enosis Neon Paralimni, APOEL, PAOK, Aris Limassol and Ethnikos Achna.

Yiasoumi has made 63 appearances for the Cyprus national football team in which he scored 7 goals.

Honours

Club
PAOK
Greek Cup: 2002–03

References

External links

1975 births
Living people
APOEL FC players
Enosis Neon Paralimni FC players
PAOK FC players
Aris Limassol FC players
Ethnikos Achna FC players
AEK Larnaca FC players
Cypriot First Division players
Super League Greece players
Cypriot footballers
Cyprus international footballers
Greek Cypriot people
Association football forwards
Cypriot expatriate footballers
Expatriate footballers in Greece
Cypriot expatriates in Greece
People from Larnaca